Hasan is a village in the Durrës County, western Albania. At the 2015 local government reform it became part of the municipality Krujë.

References

Populated places in Krujë
Villages in Durrës County